Miliusa parviflora is a species of plant in the family Annonaceae. It is endemic to Peninsular Malaysia. It is threatened by habitat loss.

References

parviflora
Endemic flora of Peninsular Malaysia
Vulnerable plants
Taxonomy articles created by Polbot